Kryuchki is a rural locality (a settlement) in Tretyakovsky Selsoviet, Tretyakovsky District, Altai Krai, Russia. The population was 129 as of 2013. There are 3 streets.

Geography 
Kryuchki is located 28 km southwest of Staroaleyskoye (the district's administrative centre) by road. Tretyakovo is the nearest rural locality.

References 

Rural localities in Tretyakovsky District